Taşgeçit Bridge (literally Stone gate bridge) is a Roman bridge in Mersin Province, Turkey.

It was over a now dried up creek, a tributary of Lamas River.

There are a few written sources on the bridge. According to Professor Serra Durugönül of Mersin University Archaeology department, the bridge was constructed in the 2nd century during the Roman rule in Anatolia. It is a stone bridge with two arches. Even today the bridge is quite usable. However the creek has dried up and the ancient road has already been wiped off . Thus the bridge is out of usage. Presently there are water pipes from a nearby water regulator to villages passing under the arches.

References

History of Mersin Province
Erdemli District
Roman bridges in Turkey
Stone arch bridges
Olba territorium